In music, Op. 3 stands for Opus number 3. Compositions that are assigned this number include:

 Bach – Organ concerto
 Beethoven – String Trio
 Berg – String Quartet
 Britten – A Boy Was Born
 Chopin – Introduction and Polonaise brillante
 Dvořák – Symphony No. 1 in C minor "The Bells of Zlonice"
 Gottschalk – La Savane
 Handel – Concerti Grossi, Op. 3
 Haydn – String Quartets, Op. 3
 Ilyich – The Voyevoda
 Mendelssohn – Piano Quartet No. 3
 Myaskovsky – Symphony No. 1
 Rachmaninoff – Morceaux de fantaisie
 Rachmaninoff – Prelude in C-sharp minor
 Rautavaara – A Requiem in Our Time
 Schumann – Etudes After Paganini Caprices
 Stamitz – Symphony in D major, Op. 3, No. 2
 Strauss – Wiener Carneval
 Stravinsky – Scherzo fantastique
 Vivaldi – L'estro armonico
 Zemlinsky – Clarinet Trio